The 2004 Mountain West Conference baseball tournament took place from May 26 through 29. All six of the league's teams met in the double-elimination tournament held at University of Nevada, Las Vegas's Earl Wilson Stadium. Third seeded UNLV won their second straight and second overall Mountain West Conference Baseball Championship with a championship game score of 6–3 and earned the conference's automatic bid to the 2004 NCAA Division I baseball tournament.

Seeding 
The teams were seeded based on regular season conference winning percentage only. New Mexico claimed the second seed by winning the season series against UNLV.

Results

All-Tournament Team 
The following players were named to the All-Tournament team.

Most Valuable Player 
Matt Luca, a sophomore pitcher for the champion UNLV Rebels, was named the tournament Most Valuable Player.

References 

Tournament
Mountain West Conference baseball tournament
Mountain West Conference baseball tournament
Mountain West Conference baseball tournament
College baseball tournaments in Nevada
Sports competitions in the Las Vegas Valley